Belonimorphis belonimorphis is a species of very small sea snail, a marine gastropod mollusk in the family Cerithiopsidae. The species was described by Jay and Drivas in 2002. It is the sole species within the genus Belonimorphis.

References

Cerithiopsidae
Gastropods described in 2002